Gnoma admirala is a species of beetle in the family Cerambycidae. It was described by Dillon and Dillon in 1951.

Subspecies
 Gnoma admirala admirala Dillon & Dillon, 1951
 Gnoma admirala pallida Dillon & Dillon, 1951

References

Lamiini
Beetles described in 1951